Toke Holst (born 1 December 1981) is a Danish handballer, currently playing for Danish Handball League side Aarhus GF. He joined the club from league rivals Team Tvis Holstebro in 2004.

Holst is noted for a single appearance for the Danish national handball team.

External links
 Player info

1981 births
Living people
Danish male handball players